Juraj Masárik (1 March 1990 in Piešťany) is a Slovak footballer who plays as a defender for the DOXXbet liga club TJ Iskra Borčice.

External links
Eurofotbal profile 
 at official club website 

1990 births
Living people
Slovak footballers
FK Dubnica players
FK Iskra Borčice players
Slovak Super Liga players
Association football defenders
Sportspeople from Piešťany